Justice Gilbert may refer to:

James H. Gilbert, associate justice of the Minnesota Supreme Court
S. Price Gilbert, associate justice of the Georgia Supreme Court